The 2019–20 season (officially known as Liga de Plata and also as Torneo Luis Baltazar Ramírez) will be El Salvador's Segunda División de Fútbol Salvadoreño. The season will be split into two championships Apertura 2019 and Clausura 2020. The champions of the Apertura and Clausura play the direct promotion playoff every year. The winner of that series ascends to Primera División de Fútbol de El Salvador.

On 13 March 2020, the FESFUT suspended Primera and Segunda division indefinitely following the outbreak of coronavirus in El Salvador.[5] On 28 April 2020, it was announced that Primera and Segunda campaigns would not resume, after the country banned all sporting events until September.[6] On 30 April 2020, No champions were crowned following the cancellation of the 2019–20 season and it would be no club promoted or relegated.

Changes from the 2019–20 seasons
Teams promoted to 2019–20 Primera División de El Salvador
 El Vencedor

Teams relegated to Segunda División de Fútbol Salvadoreño  - Apertura 2019
 Firpo 

Teams relegated to Tercera Division de Fútbol Salvadoreño - Apertura 2019 
 No teams relegated

Teams promoted from Tercera Division De Fútbol Profesional - Apertura 2019
 Turin

 C.D. Cacahuatique

New Teams or teams that purchased a spot in the Segunda division
 C.D. Titán (bought one of two spots available  for $TBD)
 C.D. Topiltzin ( bought one of two spots available  for $TBD)
 Marte Soyapango (bought spot of Chaguite for $TBD)
 AD Juayúa (bought spot of Turin FESA for $TBD)
 Gerardo Barrios (Best Third division team promoted in place of recently relegated Luis Angel Firpo)

Teams that failed to register for the Apertura 2019
 C.D. Chagüite (sold their spot to Marte Soyapango)
 Firpo (Failed to meet the requirements and therefore were relegated)
 Turin (sold their spot to Juayúa)

Notable death from Apertura 2019 season and 2020 Clausura season
The following people associated with the Segunda Division have died in Middle of 2019 and mid 2020.

 Jaime Rafael Mina (San Pablo) [ ]
 * Victor Emmanuel Rodriguez (ex Fuerte Aguilares player)

Stadiums and locations

Personnel and kits

Managerial changes

Apertura 2019

Foreign players

Conference standings

Group A

Group B

Season statistics

Top scorers

Hat-tricks

Finals

Quarterfinals 

A.D. Juayua  won 2-1 on aggregate.

Platense won 2-1 on aggregate.

Brujos de Izalco won 3-1 on aggregate.

Racing Jr won 3-2 on aggregate.

Semifinals 

Racing Jr won 1-0 on aggregate.

Platense won 1-0 on aggregate.

Final

First leg

Second leg

Platense won 4-3 on aggregate.

Individual awards

Clausura 2020

Teams

Foreign players

Conference standings

Group A

Group B

Season statistics

Top scorers

Finals 
The final round of matches and the final were cancelled due to the Coronavirus pandemic. No champion was awarded for the Clausura season and Platense who won the Apertura 2019 season would play Jocoro FC in a promotion-relegation match.

References

External links
 

Segunda División de Fútbol Salvadoreño seasons
2019–20 in Salvadoran football
EL Sal